Chris Tordoff is an English-born Irish comedian, actor, writer, YouTuber, and streamer. He is best known for co-creating the RTÉ mockumentary series Hardy Bucks, in which he plays drug dealer Francis "The Viper" Higgins. He has reprised the role in other media, such as The Hardy Bucks Movie, the comedy series Republic of Telly and Viper's View, and on his own YouTube and Twitch channels.

Early life 
Tordoff was born in Leeds and moved to the Irish town of Swinford as a teenager.

Career 
Tordoff co-created Hardy Bucks with his friend Martin Maloney as a web series on YouTube in 2009. He co-wrote, directed, and starred in it as antagonist Francis "The Viper" Higgins, a small-time drug dealer. In 2009, it won RTÉ Television's Storyland competition, and was commissioned as a series for television. For the second series, Liz Gill took over directorial duties from Tordoff. He reprised the role in the 2013 film based on the series, The Hardy Bucks Movie. He was also a guest on Republic of Telly on RTÉ.

Tordoff also creates online comedy on his own YouTube channel, under the name Francis Higgins. One series, World News, was a parodical news show inspired by a segment on Euronews called No Comment. Tordoff used clips from No Comment to produce his own videos, but was threatened with legal action by Euronews in 2016. This led to Tordoff being commissioned by RT UK to produce 50 episodes of Viper's View, as an insert for Sam Delaney's News Thing. In October 2016, Tordoff was nominated for an IFTA in the Best Male Performance category for his role as Francis Higgins.

Since 2019, Tordoff has regularly streamed video games on his YouTube channel, playing them in character either as Francis Higgins, Tommy Shlug (a bus driver from the west of Ireland), Conor Williams (a D4 sales executive for Mercedes Ireland), or Fontaine (a gritty New York detective), as well as others.

Filmography

Film

Television

References

1980s births
Living people
21st-century Irish male actors
Year of birth missing (living people)
Male actors from Leeds
People from Swinford, County Mayo